Hofireh-ye Hajji Barbeyn (also Romanized as Ḩofīreh-ye Ḩājjī Barbeyn; also known as Ḩofeyreh, Ḩofeyrīyeh, and Ḩofīreh) is a village in Mosharrahat Rural District, in the Central District of Ahvaz County, Khuzestan Province, Iran. At the 2006 census, its population was 535, in 84 families.

References 

Populated places in Ahvaz County